The University of Chichester is a public university located in West Sussex, England, which became a university in 2005. Campuses are based in the city of Chichester and the nearby coastal resort of Bognor Regis and an associate campus for commercial music on the Isle of Wight.

The University of Chichester has 14 departments, with specialisms including Humanities, Sport, Musical Theatre, acting and Education. Its heritage stretches back into the nineteenth century when, in 1839, Bishop Otter College was established. Since 2013, both campuses have seen major expansion-led building works through National Lottery funding and other funding.

The University of Chichester is a member of The Cathedrals Group.

History 

In 1840, a school for training 'Masters' was founded by William Otter, Bishop of Chichester, which was rebuilt in his memory as the Bishop Otter College in 1849. The original buildings, created in a neo-Tudor style, were designed by the architect J. Butler.

In 1873, the campus became a training institute for women teachers due to the activism of Louisa Hubbard after the Elementary Education Act 1870 which created demand for school teachers. Men were admitted to the college in 1957.

In the 20th century the campus was gradually expanded to meet demand. There was a large extension in the 1960s, including a steep gabled cruciform chapel, designed by the architect, Peter Shepheard.

During the 1970s the Principal of Bishop Otter College was Gordon McGregor, who went on to be Principal of Ripon and York St John and latterly Emeritus Professor of Education at the University of Leeds.

At Bognor Regis a teacher training college was founded in the 1940s to support the expansion of education.

In 1977 Bishop Otter College and the Bognor Regis college were merged to form the West Sussex Institute of Higher Education (WSIHE), with degrees being awarded by CNAA and later the University of Southampton.  Alumni from this period include the actor Jason Merrells and the author Paula Byrne. Between 1995 and 1999, it was known as Chichester Institute of Higher Education. It gained degree-awarding powers in 1999, becoming  known as University College Chichester, and became recognised as a full university in October 2005.

In 2015 Chichester University secured government and lotteries commission funding to the value of approximately £8millions and embarked on a plan of expansions at both academic sites, involving the demolition of several smaller collegiate structures, that were no longer suitable for purpose and the construction of facilities for academia, administration and sports.

In January 2017 the multi-million pound purpose built Academic Block was opened, hosting lecture and seminar rooms, a brand new Students' Union shop and a sprung floor dance space.

Campuses

College Lane

The main campus (Bishop Otter) is situated at College Lane, Chichester and is set in surroundings which include historic buildings and modern facilities. It is a five-minute walk from Chichester city centre. Chichester Festival Theatre is adjacent to the campus.

In 2016, the Chichester campus underwent redevelopment with a new Academic Building for teaching. Other work included construction of a sports dome, chapel extension, courtyard, Sports Hall and Gym refurbishment, as well as major development work on the Library or Learning Resources Centre (LRC) which has three floors.

The Otter Gallery was located within the LRC. It offered public art exhibitions and workshops throughout the year. It was permanently closed against public protest at the end of 2018.

Bognor Regis

The Bognor Regis campus is in a leafy environment five minutes from the sea, and has three mansion houses with Georgian architecture: St Michael's, the Dome and Mordington House.

The Bognor Regis campus is close to Hotham Park., The park surrounds Hotham House, built in 1792 by Sir Richard Hotham. Also nearby is the Ice House – the original 18th Century refrigerator of Hotham Park Estate.

The university's £35million Tech Park was opened on Wednesday 3 October 2018 by the Duke and Duchess of Sussex.

Organisation 

The university department structure can be found below.

	
 Business School
 Childhood, Social Work and Social Care
 Creative Industries
 Computing
 Dance
 Education
 Engineering and Design
 English and Creative Writing
 Fine Art
 Humanities
 Music
 Nursing and Allied Health
 Psychology and Counselling
 Sport including Adventure Education, Sport Sciences, PE, Sport Development and Sport Management
 Theatre (Performing Arts)

Academics

 Hakim Adi
 Stephen Baysted
 Frederick Crowe
 Vicki Feaver
 Dave Hill
 Duncan Honeybourne
 Benjamin Noys
 Peter Keen
 Theo Moore
 Jonathan Little
 Laura Ritchie
 Andrew Sant
 Diana Seach

See also
 Armorial of UK universities
 College of Education
 List of universities in the UK

References

External links 

 University of Chichester

 
Educational institutions established in 1839
1839 establishments in England
University
Universities UK